Gabriel Alejandro Brizuela (born August 12, 1979) is an Argentine professional racing cyclist.

Major results

2005
 4th Overall Vuelta Ciclista de Chile
2006
 3rd Overall Vuelta a Mendoza
2007
 3rd Overall Vuelta al Chana
 4th Overall Tour de San Luis
2008
 2nd Overall Vuelta a San Juan
1st Stage 7
2011
 1st Prologue & Stage 3 Vuelta a Mendoza
2013
 2nd Overall Vuelta a Mendoza
1st Stage 2
2015
 1st Overall Vuelta a Mendoza
2017
 3rd Overall Vuelta a Mendoza

External links

1979 births
Living people
Argentine male cyclists
Place of birth missing (living people)